Copernicia glabrescens is a palm which is endemic to western and west central Cuba.

References

glabrescens
Trees of Cuba